New Thing or The New Thing may refer to:
 Free jazz, a subgenre of jazz music often referred to as "The New Thing"
 New Thing at Newport, a 1965 free jazz album by John Coltrane and Archie Shepp
 The New Thing & the Blue Thing, a 1965 free jazz album by Ted Curson
 New Thing!, a 2005 compilation album of jazz music
 New Thing (Enuff Z'Nuff song) 1989
 New Thing (Rye Rye song), 2011
 New Thang, a 2014 single by Redfoo